Dendropsophus virolinensis is a species of frog in the family Hylidae.
It is endemic to Colombia.
Its natural habitats are subtropical or tropical seasonally wet or flooded lowland grassland, swamps, freshwater marshes, intermittent freshwater marshes, pastureland, and heavily degraded former forest.

References

virolinensis
Amphibians of Colombia
Amphibians described in 1997
Taxonomy articles created by Polbot